The ACM SIGSOFT Software Engineering Notes (SEN) is published by the Association for Computing Machinery (ACM) for the Special Interest Group on Software Engineering (SIGSOFT). It was established in 1976, and the first issue appeared in May 1976. It provides a forum for informal articles and other information on software engineering. The headquarters is in New York City. Since 1990, it has been published five times a year.

References

External links
 ACM SIGSOFT Software Engineering Notes homepage
 

Computer magazines published in the United States
Association for Computing Machinery magazines
Engineering magazines
Magazines established in 1976
Magazines published in New York City
Software engineering publications